Jean Louis Charles Jeener is a Belgian physical chemist and physicist, well known for his experimental and theoretical contributions to spin thermodynamics in solids and for his invention of Two-dimensional nuclear magnetic resonance spectroscopy. He was born in Brussels in 1931, son of Raymond Jeener (biologist) and Hélène Massar. He is married to Françoise Henin.

Early life

Jeener grew up in Brussels.

Career
Jeener was professor in Physics at Université Libre de Bruxelles (ULB) from 1960 until he retired in 1996.

At ULB, Jeener researched spin thermodynamics and spin dynamics in solids. He introduced the “Jeener-Broekaert sequence” for creating observable quantities of dipolar order in solids.

Nuclear magnetic resonance spectroscopy
Jeener is best known for introducing two-dimensional NMR spectroscopy (2DNMR). In a lecture at the AMPERE Summer School in Basko Polje, Yugoslavia, September 1971, he proposed a novel technique, later known as Correlation Spectroscopy (COSY), in which the response of the nuclear spins to two radio frequency pulses is treated by a double Fourier transformation with respect to the delay between the pulses, and the delay after the second pulse. This technique gives detailed information about the molecular links between atoms, inaccessible with previous techniques. 

The first experimental demonstration of this technique was carried out by Richard R. Ernst (Nobel prize 1991).

Later, Jeener introduced a variant of 2DNMR, today known as Nuclear Overhauser Effect Spectroscopy (NOESY), that gives detailed information about the spin-lattice relaxation matrix, and about the spatial relation between atoms in complex molecules.

2DNMR and its multi-dimensional extensions reveal so much more information about the chemical and physical environment of the spins that they have since been used in almost all fields of NMR.  Among other applications, they enable detailed reconstruction of the 3-dimensional structure of complex biological macro molecules.

Recognition
Jeener is recipient of several distinctions, including the Prix Quinquennal of the Fonds National de la Recherche Scientifique (Prix Dr. A. De Leeuw-Damry-Bourlart), the Prix Ampère, the ISMAR Prize, and the Russell Varian Prize. He is Doctor Honoris Causa of ETH-Zürich. The Jean Jeener NMR Centre, inaugurated in 2010 at the Vrije Universiteit Brussel, is named after him.

Selected journal publications

Bibliography

References

External links 

Home page of J. Jeener (under construction)

1931 births
Living people
Belgian chemists
Belgian physicists
Scientists from Brussels